This is a list of the deadliest tornadoes in world history. This list includes confirmed individual tornadoes that caused 100 or more direct fatalities.

The deadliest tornadoes by far have occurred in a small area of Bangladesh and East India. In this  area, 24 of the 42 tornadoes which are known to have killed 100 or more people occurred. This is probably due to the high population density and poor economic status of the area, as well as a lack of early warning system.

Most of the rest occurred in the United States in 1953 or earlier, before tornado prediction efforts began. The only tornado on this list to occur during the 21st century is the Joplin tornado, which occurred on May 22, 2011.

Uncertainty

There are many sources of uncertainty in the statistics mentioned on this page. Before the 20th century, and even until recently in third-world countries, records-keeping was spotty at best. Before the American Civil War, slave deaths were often not included in tornado death tolls. Fatalities of Africans in the Southern US were routinely not counted through the 1940s and in some cases into the 1950s. Most tornadoes from many decades ago had no official government report on damage or casualties, so statistics must be compiled from local newspapers, which are not always a reliable, consistent, or comprehensive source. Many death tolls were published with people still missing, or with people critically injured and likely to die later. News media, Red Cross, and other counts don't necessarily distinguish whether a death was directly caused by a tornado and can include deaths during cleanup efforts. Routine counting of fatalities began in the US in the 1950s. In Bangladesh and India, exact populations of towns were often not known, so most death figures are approximate. Individual tornado descriptions go into more detail on these uncertainties. Officials in some areas, for example in Russia (and the USSR) and parts of Europe, until recent years denied that tornadoes occur in those areas thus fatalities may not be counted as tornadic.

There is also meteorological uncertainty with the nature of many tornadoes on this list. Before the 1970s, and even now outside of North America, most tornado paths were not thoroughly surveyed to ensure that the storm was indeed a single tornado and not a series of tornadoes from the same storm (a tornado family). Often a single supercell can produce a new tornado soon after or even before the demise of an old tornado, giving the appearance to many observers that a single tornado has caused all the damage. On this list, if it is likely that the tornado was in fact two or more tornadoes, it will appear in italics.

Tornadoes

''*This was probably not a single tornado, but a tornado family (a group of tornadoes formed by the same supercell). However, it is impossible to tell from historical records, so officially they are recorded as a single tornado.
†May have been higher.
#Most injury figures are approximate

See also
List of deadliest Storm Prediction Center days by outlook risk level
List of natural disasters by death toll
List of tornadoes and tornado outbreaks
List of tornado-related deaths at schools
List of F5 and EF5 tornadoes
 List of F4 and EF4 tornadoes
 List of F4 and EF4 tornadoes (2010–2019)
 List of F4 and EF4 tornadoes (2020–present)
Tornado records

References

Book reference

External links
 The 25 Deadliest U.S. Tornadoes by the Storm Prediction Center

 100 or more deaths
tornadoes